was a Japanese actress and voice actress.  She was born Ryōko Sakurai in Kyoto, Japan.  She was known for her low voice. Kinomiya was the Japanese dub voice of Faye Dunaway. In 2008 she won a Merit Award at the 2nd Seiyu Awards. Kinomiya died of multiple organ failure on 13 December 2013 at the age of 82.

Filmography

Television animation
1960s
Astro Boy (1963)
Speed Racer (Aya Mifune/Mom Racer)
1970s
Wandering Sun (1971) - (Michiko Nohara)
Devilman (TV) (1972) - (Ebain)
Galaxy Express 999 (1978) - (Queen Prometheum)
The Rose of Versailles (1979) - (Madame Du Barry)
1980s
Queen Millennia (1981) - (Narrator)
City Hunter 3 (TV) (1989) - (Haruko)
1990s
Hell Teacher Nube (1996) - (Narrator)
2000s
Cyborg 009: The Cyborg Soldier (2001) - (Black Ghost)
Wolf's Rain (TV) (2003) - (Hanabit)
Cromartie High School (TV) (2003) - (Narrator)
Tweeny Witches (2003) - (Grand Master of Witches)
Phoenix (2004) - (Himiko)

Original Video Animation
Crest of the Royal Family (1988) - (Narrator)
Galerians: Rion (2002) - (Dorothy)

Animated films
Galaxy Express 999 (1979) - (Queen Promethium)
Fumoon (film) (1980) - (Mozu)
Adieu Galaxy Express 999 (1981) - (Queen Promethium)
The Fantastic Adventures of Unico (1981) - (Yokaze)
Arion (film) (1986) - (Gaia)
Doraemon: Nobita's Fantastical Three Musketeers (1994) - (Voice)
Crayon Shin-chan: Fierceness That Invites Storm! The Singing Buttocks Bomb (2007) - (Kinpa)
Saint Young Men (movie) (2013) - (Narrator)

Dubbing
10,000 BC (2011 TV Asahi edition) (Old Mother (Mona Hammond))
Daddy Day Care (Miss Gwyneth Harridan (Anjelica Huston))
Great Expectations (Ms. Nora Dinsmoor (Anne Bancroft))
Super Mario Bros. (Lena (Fiona Shaw))

References

External links
 
 

1931 births
2013 deaths
Voice actresses from Kyoto
Japanese voice actresses
Deaths from multiple organ failure
Tokyo Actor's Consumer's Cooperative Society voice actors